Russell Canouse (born June 11, 1995) is an American professional soccer player who plays as a midfielder for D.C. United in Major League Soccer.

Club career

Europe 
Canouse joined the New York Red Bulls youth academy as a teenager, before moving to Germany to pursue professional opportunities there. He made his debut for German team TSG 1899 Hoffenheim first-team on March 12, 2016, coming-on as a substitute in a Bundesliga game against VfL Wolfsburg. Canouse spent the 2016–17 season on loan at VfL Bochum.

D.C. United 

Canouse joined D.C. United of Major League Soccer in August 2017. He built a great relationship with Patrick Mullins and provided him an assist against New York Red Bulls on September 27, 2017. Russell is a notable player of D.C. United for his great teamwork and playing.

On October 13, 2018, Canouse scored his first D.C United goal in the 86th minute against FC Dallas in a 1–0 win, putting D.C. above the playoff line.

On July 27, 2019, Canouse got injured with a collapsed lung, and was expected to be out for 3–6 weeks. After out for over a month, he came back from injury, starting against the Montreal Impact on August 31, 2019. He played as a right-back during the game, a position not familiar to Canouse, but he performed well and helped DC win 3–0 over Montreal. It was reported that 2nd Bundesliga team, Dynamo Dresden, was interested in Canouse in December 2019.

Canouse scored his second goal for United on February 29, 2020, in D.C. United's 2020 season home opener. The next week he signed a three-year contract extension with D.C. United.

International
Canouse played with the U.S. national under-20 team. He captained the side at the 2015 CONCACAF under-20 Championship. He was then named to the U.S. roster for the under-20 World Cup, but had to withdraw due to injury. 

On January 8, 2018, Canouse received a call-up for the United States men's national soccer team for a friendly against Bosnia and Herzegovina.

Personal life 
Canouse has a half-brother named Kyle Oster. Canouse is married to Erika Canouse. Canouse is also an officially licensed realtor with Keller Williams and is on the Next Move | Nation’s Capital team which is part of the Next Move Network.

Statistics

References

External links
US Soccer bio

1995 births
Living people
2. Bundesliga players
2015 CONCACAF U-20 Championship players
American soccer players
American expatriate soccer players
American expatriate soccer players in Germany
Association football midfielders
Bundesliga players
D.C. United players
Major League Soccer players
Soccer players from Pennsylvania
Sportspeople from Lancaster, Pennsylvania
TSG 1899 Hoffenheim players
TSG 1899 Hoffenheim II players
United States men's under-20 international soccer players
VfL Bochum players